Stanchfield Lake is a lake in Morrison County, in the U.S. state of Minnesota.

Stanchfield Lake bears the name of a local lumberman.

See also
List of lakes in Minnesota

References

Lakes of Minnesota
Lakes of Morrison County, Minnesota